The BMT Nassau Street Line is a rapid transit line of the B Division of the New York City Subway system in Manhattan. It is a continuation of the Brooklyn BMT Jamaica Line after crossing the Williamsburg Bridge into Manhattan; it continues to a junction with the BMT Broadway Line just before the Montague Street Tunnel. Afterwards, the line reenters Brooklyn. Although the tracks continue past  Broad Street, there has been no regular service past that station since June 25, 2010. While the line is officially recognized as the Nassau Street Line, it only serves one station on Nassau Street: Fulton Street.

The line is served at all times by the J train. The Z provides supplemental rush hour service, operating in the peak direction. The M service has historically served the Nassau Street Line, but since 2010, the M has been rerouted via the Chrystie Street Connection to run on the IND Sixth Avenue Line, as a replacement for the V, which was discontinued due to financial shortfalls. The M continues to serve one Nassau Street Line station: the Essex Street station.



Service
The following services use part or all of the BMT Nassau Street Line. The trunk line's bullets are colored :

History

Planning, construction, and first section 
After the original lines of the Interborough Rapid Transit Company (IRT) opened, the city began planning new lines. Two of these were extensions of that system, to Downtown Brooklyn and Van Cortlandt Park, but the other two – the Centre Street Loop subway (or Brooklyn Loop subway) and Fourth Avenue subway (in Brooklyn) – were separate lines for which construction had not progressed as far. The Centre Street Loop, approved on January 25, 1907 as a four-track line (earlier proposed as two tracks), was to connect the Brooklyn Bridge, Manhattan Bridge, and Williamsburg Bridge via Centre Street, Canal Street, and Delancey Street. An extension south from the Brooklyn Bridge under William Street to Wall Street was also part of the plan, as were several loops towards the Hudson River and a loop connecting the bridges through Brooklyn. Trains coming from Brooklyn via the Manhattan and Williamsburg Bridges would be able to head back to that borough via the Brooklyn Bridge as well as the Montague Street Tunnel at the south end of the Centre Street Loop, and vice versa. All trains would pass through a large central station with four tracks and five platforms at Chambers Street, just north of the Brooklyn Bridge.

Construction contracts for the main line in Manhattan were awarded in early 1907, though the city had not yet selected an operator for the line. The line was assigned to a proposed Tri-borough system in early 1908 and to the Brooklyn Rapid Transit Company (BRT) in the Dual Contracts, adopted on March 4, 1913.
The BRT began operating through a short piece of subway, coming off the Williamsburg Bridge under Delancey Street to Essex Street, on September 16, 1908. The Centre Street Loop was opened to Chambers Street on August 4, 1913, with temporary operation at first on the two west tracks. The south tracks on the Manhattan Bridge, also running into Chambers Street, were placed in service on June 22, 1915.

Completion 
Under Contract 4 of the Dual Contracts, the BRT (later reorganized as the Brooklyn–Manhattan Transit Corporation or BMT) was to operate the Nassau Street Line. The southern portion of the line remained incomplete for several years, and the BRT brought a $30 million suit against the city for not building the line before January 1, 1917. By 1924, most of the projects under the Dual Contracts had been completed, but not the Nassau Street Line. The BMT chairman Gerhard Dahl was persistent at requesting that the city build the line, but Mayor John Hylan refused to act during his final two years as mayor. Once James Walker succeeded him as mayor, contracts for the project were awarded, with the portion north of Liberty Street awarded to Marcus Contracting Company and the portion south of Liberty Street awarded to Moranti and Raymond.

Work was projected to be completed in 39 months, and in March 1929, sixty percent of the work had been finished. As a result, 89 buildings had to be underpinned to ensure that they would stay on their foundations, including the New York World, New York Tribune, Morse, and Temple Court Buildings, as well as the United States Subtreasury and Fraunces Tavern. An area filled with quicksand and water, that used to belong to a spring, was found between John Street and Broad Street. Construction was done at night so as to not disturb workers in the Financial District. The whole cost of the construction of the line was $10.072 million for the -long extension, or $2,068 a foot, which was three times the normal cost of construction at the time. Because of the curve of Nassau Street at Fulton Street, that station had to be constructed on two levels; the upper level carried southbound trains with entrances on the east side of Nassau Street, and the lower level carried northbound trains with entrances on the west side of Nassau Street.

The Nassau Street Loop opened at 3 p.m. on May 29, 1931, when Mayor Jimmy Walker took the controls of a train of D-type Triplex cars from Chambers Street to Broad Street. The line was extended two stops from its previous terminus at Chambers Street through the Fulton Street and Broad Street stations and to a connection to the Montague Street Tunnel, which allowed trains to run to Brooklyn. The line's completion allowed subway trains to operate via the Culver Line, whose operation used to consist of elevated trains that ran to Ninth Avenue, where transfers were made to West End subway trains. The new line provided ten percent more capacity than the existing service through DeKalb Avenue. Service on the Jamaica Line was extended to operate to this station. The station at Wall Street was named "Broad Street" to distinguish it from the already-open Wall Street stations on the Lexington Avenue Line and Seventh Avenue Line.

Plans for the Chambers Street area changed several times during construction, always including a never-completed connection to the Brooklyn Bridge tracks. By 1910, only the west two tracks were to rise onto the bridge, and the east two were to continue south to the Montague Street Tunnel. As actually built for the 1931 opening south of Chambers Street, the two outer tracks ran south to the tunnel, while the two inner tracks continued several blocks in a lower level stub tunnel to allow trains to reverse direction.

Service changes and modifications 
A major change to the Nassau Street Line occurred on November 27, 1967, when the extensive Chrystie Street reroutes resulted in the discontinuation of service over the south tracks of the Manhattan Bridge into Chambers Street, as those tracks were now directly connected to the upper level (Broadway) Canal Street station.  This ended all "loop" service, which had most recently seen rush hour "specials" on both the Brighton and 4th Avenue lines operating via both the Manhattan Bridge and Montague Street tunnel in single directions.

As part of the Metropolitan Transportation Authority's 2000–2004 Capital Program, the reconfiguration of the Nassau Street Line between Canal Street and Essex Street took place. As part of the plan, northbound trains were rerouted via the second track from the west, and the former northbound platforms at Canal Street and Bowery were closed. The second track from the east was removed. Work on the project started in 2001. This change took effect on September 20, 2004. The reconfiguration provided additional operational flexibility by providing a third through track (previously the center two tracks stub-ended at Canal Street), which was equipped with reverse signaling. The consolidation of the Bowery and Canal Street stations was intended to enhance customer security while consolidating passengers onto what used to be the southbound platforms. The project was completed in May 2005, seven months behind its scheduled completion. The project cost $36 million.

On June 14, 2015, weekend J service was extended back to Broad Street; this was proposed in July 2014 to improve weekend service between Lower Manhattan and Brooklyn. Between 1990 and 2015, when weekend service terminated at Canal, between September 30, 1990 and January 1994, or Chambers Streets, from January 1994 to June 2015, Broad Street and the J/Z platforms at Fulton Street were two of the four New York City Subway stations that lacked full-time service (the remaining two being the platforms for the IRT 42nd Street Shuttle).

Station listing

References

External links 

 nycsubway.org – BMT Nassau Street-Jamaica Line

Brooklyn–Manhattan Transit Corporation
New York City Subway lines
Railway lines opened in 1908
1908 establishments in New York City